The Chopstars, also known as Chopstar DJs or simply Chopstars, are a collective  that include American DJs and turntablists that perform chopped and screwed remixes of popular music under Chop Not Slop Ent. including Drake's 2011 Take Care album, as well as Little Dragon's 2014 Nabuma Rubberband album. and recently released Savage Mode II from Metro Boomin and 21 Savage. Created by OG Ron C, the co-founder of Swishahouse Records, it is a homage to the late DJ Screw. The motto of The Chopstars is "Keeping DJ Screw alive since 2001" and "Dedicated to the memory of DJ Screw." Notable members include DJ Candlestick, DJ Lil Steve, Mike G (a member of Odd Future), DJ Ryan Wolf the official DJ of the Cleveland Browns, DJ Hollygrove formerly of KQBT, and Academy Award-winning director Barry Jenkins. They also received a proclamation from Houston Mayor Sylvester Turner on Nov 4th making July 1st The Chopstars Day.

In Mainstream Media
ChopNotSlop has been in mainstream media on several occasions. In 2005 Houston rapper Chamillionaire released his multi-platinum album The Sound Of Revenge in which a Chopped and Screwed version was also released with mixes by OG Ron C. To date the ChopNotSlop version has sold over 250,000 copies. In 2010 after meeting OG Ron C in Toronto rapper Drake started giving attention to ChopNotSlop via interviews and Twitter updates. On Sept 19, 2011, Drake announced his second album by tweeting "Take Care, Take Care Birthday Edition, Take Care OG Ron C Edition...10.24.11" Chopstar DJ Mixtapes have also been featured in the LA Times Music Section, as well as The New York Times Music Section. OG Ron C's ChopNotSlop version of the song "Southern Takeover" by Chamillionaire was played in the background of the warehouse scene on the NBC show The Office (Season 2. Ep15 "Boys and Girls"). The Chopstars have been the subject to many article relating to the art form of ChopNotSlop 

On January 27, 2015 OG Ron C and DJ Candlestick of The Chopstars teamed up with Little Dragon and Adult Swim to officially release a FREE ChopNotSlop remix of Nabuma Rubberband which is being distributed via Cartoon Network's Adult Swim website. In February 2017, director Barry Jenkins connected with OG Ron C and DJ Candlestick to release a ChopNotSlop version of the Moonlight soundtrack

Chopstar DJs
OG Ron C founded the Chopstar DJs to help up and coming Chopped and Screwed DJs. He first started with DJ Lil Steve who has been his protégé since 2005. In 2008 he met and brought on DJ Candlestick. In 2009 he added DJ Hollygrove and DJ Chose, a well known College and Texas Club Scene DJ/producer/artist. DJ Chose is a member of the group Brook Gang Music that OG Ron C also manages. In 2009 he hooked back up with his old Swishahouse right-hand-man Michael '5000' Watts and released "The Return Of The Realest."

ChopNotSlop Radio and App
ChopNotSlop Radio is an online radio station that was created in 2008. It boasts as the "Worlds First Chopped and Screwed Radio Station" which is dedicated to keeping DJ Screw Music alive. The current broadcast format is block programming is regular singles ChopNotSlop in the similar format of a terrestrial radio station. The stream can be listened to via ChopNotSlop App on Android or any iDevice. I

Notable members

DJs
 OG Ron C - Co-founder of Swishahouse Records, member of OVO Sound, producer of TSU on Drake’s Certified Lover Boy album.

 DJ Hollygrove - Former On-Air DJ KQBT. 93.7 The Beat Houston, currently on Shade 45 on Core DJ Radio Show

DJ Candlestick member of  OVO Sound, former on-air DJ for KQBT, current co-host of the ChopNotSlop Show Sundays on Sound 42 on Sirius XM

 DJ Ryan Wolf, official DJ for the NFL’s Cleveland Browns and on air DJ for WENZ.

 Mike G, member of Odd Future

Discography
 F-Action 1-71 (1995–present)
 The Sound of Revenge (2006)
 Chop Care (2011)
 Channel Purple (2012)
 God Forgives, I Chop (2012)
 Based on a T.R.U. Story: ChopNotSlop (2013)
 Nabuma Purple Rubberband (2015)
 Moonlight Soundtrack (2017)
 Savage Mode II (2020)
 Heroes & Villains (2023)

See also
 Beast Mode

References

American DJs